Kimmel Township is a township in Bedford County, Pennsylvania, United States. The population was 1,522 at the 2020 census.

Geography
Kimmel Township is located along the northern edge of Bedford County.

Demographics

As of the census of 2000, there were 1,609 people, 624 households, and 468 families residing in the township.  The population density was 78.7 people per square mile (30.4/km).  There were 852 housing units at an average density of 41.7/sq mi (16.1/km).  The racial makeup of the township was 99.44% White, 0.12% Native American, and 0.44% from two or more races. Hispanic or Latino of any race were 0.25% of the population.

There were 624 households, out of which 29.5% had children under the age of 18 living with them, 64.7% were married couples living together, 6.6% had a female householder with no husband present, and 25.0% were non-families. 21.2% of all households were made up of individuals, and 9.5% had someone living alone who was 65 years of age or older.  The average household size was 2.58 and the average family size was 2.99.

In the township the population was spread out, with 21.8% under the age of 18, 9.4% from 18 to 24, 30.0% from 25 to 44, 26.5% from 45 to 64, and 12.3% who were 65 years of age or older.  The median age was 38 years. For every 100 females, there were 97.9 males.  For every 100 females age 18 and over, there were 99.4 males.

The median income for a household in the township was $33,690, and the median income for a family was $38,510. Males had a median income of $30,653 versus $19,318 for females. The per capita income for the township was $16,429.  About 8.9% of families and 11.6% of the population were below the poverty line, including 15.0% of those under age 18 and 13.4% of those age 65 or over.

References

Populated places established in 1794
Townships in Bedford County, Pennsylvania
Townships in Pennsylvania
1794 establishments in Pennsylvania